Pille Raadik (born 12 February 1987) is an Estonian football defender currently playing for Åland United in Finland's Naistenliiga and the Estonian national team. She formerly played in the Meistriliiga for Flora Tallinn.

References

External links

1987 births
Living people
Estonian women's footballers
Åland United players
Estonian expatriate footballers
Kansallinen Liiga players
Estonian expatriate sportspeople in Finland
Expatriate women's footballers in Finland
Estonia women's international footballers
Footballers from Tallinn
Women's association football defenders
FC Flora (women) players